Casey Duane Tibbs (March 5, 1929 – January 28, 1990) was a rodeo cowboy, and actor. In 1979, he was inducted into the ProRodeo Hall of Fame.

Life and career
Tibbs was born to John F. Tibbs (1886–1948) and Florence M. Tibbs (1889–1974) in rural Orton northwest of Fort Pierre in Stanley County in central South Dakota. He was of English descent. He held the "World All-Around Cowboy Champion" title twice, in 1951 and 1955. He won in 1949, 1951–1954, and 1959, the world saddle bronc riding championship and in 1951 world bareback bronc riding championship. He was featured on the October 22, 1951 cover of Life magazine.

He moved in 1976 to Ramona, California, to raise and breed horses. After battling bone cancer and then lung cancer for about a year, he died at his home in Ramona, while watching the 1990 Super Bowl. He is interred at the Scotty Philip Cemetery in Fort Pierre, South Dakota.

Selected filmography
After his successful rodeo career, Tibbs became a stunt man, stunt coordinator, technical director, livestock consultant, wrangler, and actor for the film industry.  He wrote, produced, directed, and starred in the film Born to Buck.

Actor:
 Bronco Buster (1952) as Rodeo Rider
 Screen Director's Playhouse (1956, Episode: "Partners") (with Brandon deWilde) as himself
 Bus Stop (1956) as himself (uncredited but announced by rodeo announcer)
 To Tell the Truth (1957) as himself (uncredited)
 Wild Heritage (1958) as Rusty (trail boss)
 The Ann Sothern Show (1959, Episode: "Katie and the Cowboy")
 Tales of Wells Fargo (1961, Episode: "Town Against a Man") as Sheriff Jim Hogan
 Tomboy and the Champ (1961) as Himself
 A Thunder of Drums (1961) as Trooper Baker
 Stoney Burke (1962–1963) as Rodeo Judge
 The Rounders (1965) as Rafe
 Branded (1965, TV Series) as The Cowboy
 Gunpoint (1966) as Dealer (uncredited)
 The Rounders (1966, TV Series) as Folliat / Buck / 3rd Posseman
 The Monroes (1967, Episode: "To Break a Colt") (uncredited)
 A Time for Dying (1969) as Southerner's Sidekick
 The Young Rounders (1972)
 Junior Bonner (1972, rodeo coordinator) as Parade Grand Marshal (uncredited)
 Climb an Angry Mountain (1972, TV Movie) as Buck Moto
 The Waltons (1974, Episode: "The Conflict") as Flagman
 Breakheart Pass (1975) as Jackson
 More Wild Wild West (1980, TV Movie) as Juanita's brother (final film role)
Stunts:
 A Thunder of Drums (1961) (stunts) (uncredited)
 The Rounders (1965) (stunts)
 Gunpoint (1966) (stunts) (uncredited)
 The Plainsman (1966) (stunts) (uncredited)
 Texas Across the River (1966) (stunt coordinator) (uncredited)
 Firecreek (1968) (stunts) (uncredited)
 Heaven with a Gun (1969) (stunts) (uncredited)
 The Cowboys (1972) (stunts) (uncredited)
 Once Upon a Texas Train (1988) (TV) (stunt coordinator)
Director:
 The Young Rounders (1966)
 Born to Buck (1966; and producer)

Tributes
 Annual Casey Tibbs Ramona Roundup in Ramona, California
 28-foot-tall bronze likeness, ProRodeo Hall of Fame, Colorado Springs, Colorado
 Ian Tyson wrote a song about Tibbs for the album I Outgrew the Wagon
 Mentioned in the film Smokey and the Bandit
 Mentioned in the film Cotter
 Mentioned in the Chris LeDoux song "Back when we was kids".
 Cole Elshere plays the role of Casey Tibbs in "Floating Horses – The Life of Casey Tibbs".
 In 1979, he was inducted into the ProRodeo Hall of Fame, the highest honor in rodeo.

Honors 
1955 Rodeo Hall of Fame of the National Cowboy and Western Heritage Museum
1976 South Dakota Sports Hall of Fame
2001 Ellensburg Rodeo Hall of Fame
2002 Cheyenne Frontier Days Hall of Fame
2004 Pendleton Round-Up and Happy Canyon Hall of Fame
2010 Texas Trail of Fame
2018 California Rodeo Salinas Hall of Fame

In popular culture 

The song Casey Tibbs, also known as Casey the Rainbow Rider by Ian Tyson

References

External links

 Casey Tibbs bio from his own website
 Casey Tibbs' championship list
 
 

1929 births
1990 deaths
20th-century American male actors
All-Around
American male film actors
American male television actors
Bareback bronc riders
Deaths from bone cancer
Deaths from lung cancer in California
Male actors from South Dakota
People from Ramona, San Diego County, California
People from Stanley County, South Dakota
ProRodeo Hall of Fame inductees
Saddle bronc riders